Eckhardt Schultz (born 12 December 1964) is a retired competition rower from West Germany who won a gold medal in the coxed eights at the 1988 Summer Olympics.

References

1964 births
Olympic rowers of West Germany
Rowers at the 1988 Summer Olympics
Olympic gold medalists for West Germany
Living people
Olympic medalists in rowing
West German male rowers
Medalists at the 1988 Summer Olympics
People from Wolfsburg
Sportspeople from Lower Saxony